2nd-seeded Víctor Estrella and João Souza defeated 1st-seeded Juan Sebastián Cabal and Alejandro Falla in the final. They won 6–4, 6–4 and became the first champions of this tournament.

Seeds

Draw

Draw

References
 Doubles Draw

Seguros Bolivar Open Pereira - Doubles
2009 Doubles